Peckoltia simulata is a species of catfish in the family Loricariidae. It is native to South America, where it occurs in the Oyapock River in French Guiana. The species is typically found in small forested creeks with a substrate of gravel or sand, as well as rocks, leaves, and wood. It has been collected alongside a variety of other species, including other loricariids belonging to the genera Ancistrus, Farlowella, Guyanancistrus (although the species in this genus it has been collected with is G. longispinis, which has also been included in Pseudancistrus), Otocinclus, and Rineloricaria. 

P. simulata reaches 8.3 cm (3.3 inches) SL. Its specific epithet, simulata, derives from a Latin word meaning "counterfeit", referring to its similarity to the closely related and previously described species P. oligospila.

References 

Fish described in 2012
Ancistrini